Ashton is an abandoned townsite in sections 11 and 12 of Pleasant Hill Township in Winona County, Minnesota, United States.

History
It was reportedly on or near present-day County Road 12 about 1.5 miles east-north-east of Ridgeway, Minnesota, but it is unclear whether any vestiges of the settlement survived highway construction in the area.  A post office operated in Ashton between April 28, 1891, and November 29, 1902.

References

Former populated places in Winona County, Minnesota
Former populated places in Minnesota